The Edward M. Hackett House is a historic house located at 612 East Main Street in Reedsburg, Wisconsin. It is designed in High Victorian Gothic style, with intricate bargeboards and bay windows. The house was built and originally owned by Edward M. Hackett, a lumberman, builder, and architect who also designed the Second Empire style City Hotel, now known as Touchdown Tavern. The Hackett House was added to the National Register of Historic Places on December 26, 1984.

References

Houses completed in 1878
Houses in Sauk County, Wisconsin
Houses on the National Register of Historic Places in Wisconsin
National Register of Historic Places in Sauk County, Wisconsin
Reedsburg, Wisconsin